The men's  Greco-Roman 85 kg is a competition featured at the 2016 European Wrestling Championships, and was held in Riga, Latvia on March 13.

Medalists

Results
Legend
F — Won by fall

Final

Top half

Bottom half

Repechage

References
Official website

Men's greco-roman 85 kg